Get the Hell is a studio album by American rock band The Supersuckers. It was released on January 14, 2014, on Acetate Records.

Track listing
 "Get the Hell"
 "Something About You"
 "Fuck Up"
 "High Tonight"
 "Pushin' Thru"
 "Never Let Me Down Again"
 "Gluttonous"
 "Disaster Bastard"
 "Bein' Bad"
 "That's What You Get for Thinking"
 "Shut Your Face"
 "Rock On"

References

Supersuckers albums
2014 albums